Oskar Hagen (14 October 1888, Wiesbaden, Germany – 5 October 1957, in Madison, Wisconsin, United States) was a German art historian.

While lecturing at the University of Göttingen from 1918 to 1925, Hagen helped establish the Göttingen International Handel Festival. He established the revival of Handel operas in Germany, beginning with his heavily-edited version of Rodelinda in 1920. He later moved to the United States to be professor at the University of Wisconsin, where he founded the department of Art History. In addition to his work as an art historian, Hagen also composed original music. Hagen is the father of actress and drama teacher Uta Hagen.

References

External links
 Hagen, Oskar (Frank Leonard), Dictionary of Art Historians, Department of Art, Art History & Visual Studies at Duke University	

1888 births
1957 deaths
German art historians
Academic staff of the University of Göttingen
University of Wisconsin–Madison faculty